Raghupathi Raghavan Rajaram is a 1977 Indian Tamil-language film directed by Durai, starring Vijayakumar, Rajinikanth and Sumithra. The film was released on 12 August 1977, and did not do well at the box office. It is considered a lost film.

Plot

Cast 
 Vijayakumar as Inspector Raghupathi
 Rajinikanth as Veeraiyan
 Sumithra
 Kutty Padmini

Soundtrack 
The music was composed by Shankar–Ganesh, with lyrics written by Vaali.

References

External links 

1970s lost films
1970s Tamil-language films
1977 films
Films directed by Durai
Films scored by Shankar–Ganesh
Indian black-and-white films
Lost Indian films